Constant Lauwers (4 March 1916 – 2 April 1983) was a Belgian racing cyclist. He rode in the 1938 Tour de France.

References

External links
 

1916 births
1983 deaths
Belgian male cyclists
Place of birth missing
Tour de Suisse stage winners